Yakub (Persian: یعقوب, romanized: Yākub, lit. 'supplanter'; Persian pronunciation: [i:ʔqu:b]), born Ya'qūb (Yākūb) Shāh Chak (Persian: یعقوب شاہ چک, Kashmiri: یَعقوب شاہ ژَھک)  was the seventh and the last Chak Sultan as well as the last native ruler of Kashmir, who reigned from 1586 to 1589. Yaqub succeeded his father, Yousuf Shah Chak, under warlike conditions, after Kashmir was invaded by the Mughal forces in late 1585.

With an aggressive temperament and a contentious psyche, Yaqub firmly established a well built resistance towards the foreign invasions. His authority and influence was felt over all of the Northern India, especially in the kingdoms of the Western Himalayas. After Kashmir was invaded by the Mughal forces, Yaqub adopted a different policy than the one he adopted after he ascended to the throne in 1586. He gathered all his local enemies, including his adversed rivals and asked them for unification to achieve victory against the Mughals. Though he was found crippled and defeated, he is still regarded as a bold and powerful King of Kashmir. After his defeat, Kashmir was captured by the Mughals and made into a district and later on, an imperial province of the Mughal Empire. Qāsim Khān was assigned as the first Mughal Faujdar of Mughal Kashmir on 15 October 1586.

Early life 
Yaqub Shah Chak was the eldest son of Yousuf Shah Chak, the fourth and sixth Chak Sultan. He was an Orthodox Shia. Yaqub Shah is said to have been short-tempered, harsh and intolerant towards unalike differences.  His grandfather, Ali Shah Chak married him to Sankar Devi, the daughter of Raja Bahadur Singh of Kishtwar.

Relations with Akbar 
When Mughal Emperor Akbar ordered Yousuf Shah to appear in his court, he sent Yaqub to Akbar's court in Fatehpur Sikri with Timur Beg, the Mughal ambassador to Kashmir. Akbar, despite Yousuf's attempt to please him through his best means, was displeased as Yousuf evaded his orders not once but twice. Yaqub stayed in touch with his father and informed him of Akbar's plan regarding Kashmir. Although Yaqub was in safe hands as promised by Timur Beg, Yousuf's political stance towards the Mughal could greatly affect Akbar's treatment towards Yaqub.

While Yousuf was still under discussion with his ministers on the Mughal envoys sent by Akbar that Yaqub unexpectedly appeared in Srinagar. Having escaped the imperial Mughal camp in Khawaspur, Punjab, he took the Rajauri route to enter Srinagar. Yaqub was utterly unhappy after Akbar's hostile attitude towards him, calling him wicked and mad and giving him a meager allowance of only thirty to forty rupees. Yousuf, blinded with the fear of Mughal advancement, was furious over Yaqub's action and even wanted to imprison and punish him but was forcibly stopped by his ministers.

Resistance towards first Mughal Invasion 
After the Mughal envoys sent by Akbar failed to cooperate with the Sultanate as Yousuf stayed back. Akbar, enraged, ordered Raja Bhagwant Das, the Governor of Amber and Lahore, to invade Kashmir. Bhagwant Das set out from Attock with 5000 horses accompanied by Mirza Shah Rukh and Shah Quli Mahram. To resist against this Invasion, Yousuf organised his army. The right guard of the army was commanded by Yaqub and Abul Ma'ali. Both the belligerents met at Buliasa Pass. Even though the clash went in the favour of Kashmiris. Yousuf was convinced that he wouldn't be able to fend off Mughal invaders from the valley as hinted by Bhagwant Das himself and on 14 February 1586, Yousuf fled Kashmir and joined Bhagwant Das in the Mughal camp leaving all the internal and external matters of the state in the hands of his naive and inexperienced son, Yaqub.

Reign 
After his father's departure, Yaqub ascended the throne on 14 February 1586 with the consent of the ministers and nobles and officially adopted the title Isma'īl Shah for himself after Shah Ismail of Iran.

Struggle against Mughal forces 
As the Mughal forces suffered in heavy snowfall and the scarcity of food and resources, Kashmiri commanders inflicted great loss upon the invaders. Seeing the disintegration of his forces, Bhagwant Das started to make peace talks with Sultan Yaqub by sending Mirza Akbar Shahi to him. Both the sides agreed on ending hostilities towards each other.

Peace Treaty 
Yousuf, on the other hand, agreed on different terms with Bhagwant Das. The terms included that Yousuf would retain his throne, but the major administrative positions will be held by the Mughals. Other than this, it'll be the duty of Yousuf to dethrone Yaqub and place him in the court of Akbar. This treaty marked the end of the first Mughal invasion as the Mughal forces withdrew from Kashmir. Yousuf was presented to Akbar but was imprisoned on his orders, violating the treaty. This treaty was not approved by Yaqub and the nobles as Yaqub returned to Srinagar and had coins struck and khutba read in his name.

Injustices towards his Sunni Subjects 
Yaqub was a Shia by faith, he held antagonistic views towards the Sunnis. He sent Mulla Aini to Qazi Musa, a Sunni Imam, to add the name of Caliph Ali in every public prayer. Qazi Musa advised Yaqub to focus more on public and executive matters rather than indulging into the affairs of the Mosque. This angered Yaqub and verbally abused Qazi Musa for this impudent act. After suppressing a revolt commenced by Yaqub's arrogant and religiously sectarian views, Yaqub held Qazi Musa's disobedience responsible for the revolt and again started to oppress him over the matter of adding Caliph Ali's name in the public prayers. Qazi Musa again dismissed the Sultan's wish. This time, Sultan Yaqub ordered the execution of Qazi Musa which spread a ray of terror in every Sunni household and Mosque.

Arrogance and Contemptuous Nature 
Yaqub was so madly blinded by the false sense of security after repelling the Mughal forces that he started to neglect the advice of his ministers and counsellors. Despite the ministers warning, Yaqub left the routes entering Kashmir undefended. Yaqub also appointed Ali Dar, who was an incompetent and intoxicated minister, to the post of Wazir (prime minister), against the ministers' advice and made him handle the affairs of the Sultanate. Ali Dar was later influenced by the Sunni rebels against Yaqub.

Sunni Rebellion 
The Sunni Chak chief Shams Khan Chak, along with other chiefs, including Malik Hasan Chadura, Alam Sher Magre and the Wazir Ali Dar progressed to Lahore to seek Emperor Akbar's help regarding Yaqub's oppressive policy towards the minority. In between the journey, Malik Hasan suggested that the monsoon season was going to commence, so they should rather attack and occupy Srinagar themselves as Yaqub was away on an administrative tour. Yaqub, after hearing this news, immediately appointed Muhammad Bhat, a former Wazir during his father's reign, as his Wazir. He reached Srinagar before the rebels and organised his army. Both the sides met in Srinagar and after a fierce clash, came to a conclusion with the help of Shaikh Hasan and Baba Khalil. Baba Khalil and Mir Shamsu'd-din, the father of Shaikh Hasan, were the pirs of Sultan Yaqub. The rebels were given the Kamraz province with the seat in Sopore. Shams Chak and Hasan Chadura wanted to kill Baba Khalil and Shaikh Hasan, who were accompanying them, but were stopped by Malik Hasan, who sent them back to the capital safely. This angered Yaqub, who set out with a large army and defeated the rebels in Sopore and imprisoned Shams Chak.

Resistance towards second Mughal invasion 
Yaqub held Qazi Musa accountable for the recent rebellion and after his refusal to compute Caliph Ali's name in the public prayers, ordered his execution. This communique spread like fire, especially in Sunni majority areas who felt insecure under the Sultan's policies. Yaqub also retired Muhammad Bhat off his position and imprisoned him, appointing Nazuk Dar in his place who was incapable and inexperienced to handle the external and internal affairs. These were one of the many reasons for Mughal annexation of Kashmir as Yaqub's intolerance and harshness made Sunni pirs like Baba Daud Khaki to move away from the valley to Multan and other places.

Shaikh Yaqub Sarfi, a cousin of Baba Daud Khaki, proceeded to the court of Akbar and requested him to invade and annex Kashmir under a favourable agreement. Akbar, while disregarding the previous treaty between Bhagwant Das and Yousuf Shah, accepted the agreement and sent an army under Mirza Shah Rukh, but the latter was decisively defeated by the Kashmiri forces. He was more concerned about his return to India rather than focusing on the annexation of Kashmir. After this humiliating defeat, Akbar relieved him of his command.

This defeat didn't stop the Mughals from invading the valley. Akbar appointed Mir Qasim Khan under a new and organised army with Mirza Akbar Shahi and Fath Khan as commanders and Yaqub Sarfi and Haider Chak, a cousin of Sultan Yaqub, as guides. Qasim Khan set out from Lahore on 28 June 1586 and through the defile of Bhimber reached Rajauri. The Kashmiri commanders appointed for the defence of Rajauri route deserted and joined the invaders. Yaqub, after learning about these sudden advancements, set out from Srinagar and camped at Hirpora to face the Mughals.

Yaqub sent a force under Bahadur Chak and Naurang Chak, but Bahadur Chak deserted to the Mughals in Kapartal Pass and imprisoned Naurang Chak who was later saved. Many soldiers and commanders who were either demoralized seeing the mighty Mughal forces or held grudges against Yaqub for his policies, left the Kashmiri forces and joined the Mughals. Other Kashmiri commanders, including Yusuf Khan Chak, Aiba Khan Chak, and Sayyid Mubarak, found it impossible to stop the advancing Mughal forces and returned to Hirpora to the Kashmiri camp. Yaqub was so disheartened and discouraged after seeing these poor developments that he left Hirpora and retired to Kishtwar, which his father-in-law ruled.

The deserted chiefs, seeing Yaqub's departure and defeat, regretted over their actions and betrayed the Mughals. Seeing the chaos, Shams Chak and Muhammad Bhat escaped the prison and took charge of the Kashmiri defence in Yaqub's absence. While Yaqub was under Raja of Kishtwar's protection, Shams Chak and Husain Chak, another cousin of Sultan Yaqub, fought for the throne. Both the Mughals and Kashmiris met at Hastivanj on 10 October 1586 for a last decisive battle. At first, the Kashmiris were leading in the battlefield, but after Muhammad Qasim Nayak, his son Zafar Nayak and Muhammad Chak, the son of Shams Chak, were killed in a sudden attack, the Kashmiri forces, dispressed and crumbled, fled, pursued by the Mughals.

With this victory, the Mughals under Yadgar Hussain entered Srinagar on 14 October 1586 and had the Khutba read in the name of Emperor Akbar, thus ending the short-lived Chak Sultanate. Qasim Khan entered Srinagar the next day and the conquest of Kashmir officially ended on 15 October 1586.

Struggle for the Sultanate

First return to battlefield 
Raja of Kishtwar criticised Yaqub for his cowardly act of not facing the Mughals himself. Yaqub set out from Kishtwar with a small following and to regain his throne and Sultanate from the Mughals, he established himself at Chanderkot with Abul Ma'ali. In a short period of time, his forces expanded to about 8,000 horses. Meanwhile, Shams Chak settled in Sopore with a total of 3,000 horses and 7,000 foot and gained the support of Husain Chak. The three Chak chiefs adopted the guerrilla tactics and started to confront the Mughals in surprise attacks and cutting down their resources.

First encounter with the Mughals 
After a month and half of these attacks which caused the Mughals and Qasim Khan great loss, Qasim Khan decided to attack Yaqub. But after reaching Yaqub's camp he was informed that Yaqub has left for Srinagar. Qasim Khan sent a force under Muhammad Ali against Yaqub, who was waiting for him just outside Srinagar in the south-east of the city. Yaqub went for an attack and defeated Muhammad Ali. This greatly encouraged Yaqub, who attacked the west side of the city and set many houses at fire, including the palace in which Qasim Khan was residing. Qasim Khan left the palace and camped at the garden of Muhammad Khan Naji. He started to organise resistance and even had Haider Chak executed in the fear of him joining the opposition. Kashmiris, infuriated after hearing this news, attacked and killed every Mughal they found in the streets and corners.

Yaqub lost his distinction in front of the Kashmiri forces after he ordered the execution of Husain Chak, who was one of the main contenders for the throne and was even appointed as Sultan by his supporters. This affected Yaqub's strategical stance as his soldiers left the battlefield. Qasim Khan, on the other hand, having received reinforcement from Muhammad Khan, confronted Yaqub. Yaqub and his forces lost and fled the battlefield pursued by Akbar Shahi.

Second return to battlefield 
Although Yaqub fled to Kishtwar, the resistance continued under Shams Chak but this time against Mughals, who had the upper hand in the battlefield. Fighting ceased for two months as winter approached and in late 1587, Yaqub returned from Kishtwar and camped in a hill in the Vular Pargana (Pulwama). Shams Chak, who fled to Karnah, returned as well and settled in Sopore. The Mughals and Kashmiris had daily skirmishes with no decisive result.

Second encounter with the Mughals 
In early 1588, Qasim Khan despatched a force under Mirza Ali Khan and other Mughal commanders. They met Yaqub at Gusu and due to heavy snowfall and the Kashmiri tactics, faced an embarrassing defeat. Mirza Ali Khan was killed while his men were either killed, taken prisoners or fled to Qasim Khan. Humiliated by this defeat, Qasim Khan, on the very next day, set out to confront Yaqub himself in the Takht-i-Sulaiman. The Kashmiris were again close to lead the battle in their favour but unfortunately for them, Yaqub's sipahsalar (commander-in-chief) was killed by an arrow which pierced his eye. This demoralised the Kashmiris which led to their defeat. Even though this defeat affected the structure of the Kashmiri forces, Yaqub was still bold enough to organise his army once more.

After seeing that he alone cannot defeat the well assembled Mughal army, Yaqub started peace talks with Shams Chak. He requested Shams to forget about their past and to unite against the common enemy, the Mughal invaders. With the positive and advantageous response of Shams, Yaqub joined him with Malik Hasan and his forces in the Hanjik Fort where Shams was residing. Both the chiefs laid a joint attack on the Mughals near Hanjik. The Mughals were resolutely defeated and lost 1,500 of their men while the rest were pursued by Malik Hasan to the Zialdakar fields.

With the aftermath of this battle, Yaqub and Shams managed to capture Koh-i-Maran and stationed their forces. The Kashmiris and the Mughals had daily skirmishes for two months in which the Kashmiris dominated the Mughals. The situation became so intense for the Mughals that Qasim Khan requested Emperor Akbar for his recall. Akbar, after seeing the deteriorating circumstances in the Mughal's authority in Kashmir, replaced Qasim Khan with Yusuf Rizvi, a Sayyid commander from Mashhad,Iran. Yusuf Rizvi set out from Lahore along with Baba Khalil, Talib Isfahani and Muhammad Bhat, who had surrendered to the Mughals earlier, as guides in the middle of 1588. Yaqub sent Shams Chak's brother Lohar Chak to prevent them from entering Kashmir but the latter being a friend of Baba Khalil, joined them instead. This alarmed the Kashmiri defences as the chiefs either joined the Mughals or fled to the nearby hills. Yaqub went away to Kishtwar while Shams departed to Bring Pargana.

Third return to battlefield 
Yaqub returned from Kishtwar and settled in Panjyari, Dechhin Khawarah near Baramulla, while Shams Chak established himself in the hills of Kamraj (Anantnag). Yaqub was determined that even if the Kashmiri army is disintegrated by the Mughal domination, the spirit to fend off foreign invasions and to protect the motherland should not be diminshed in any circumstances.

Third and Last encounter with the Mughals 
After taking command and establishing the Mughal bureaus throughout Kashmir, Yusuf Rizvi sent Muhammad Bhat and Haji Miraki against Yaqub. The Mughal commanders sent a messenger to Yaqub to submit to the Mughal dominance, but Yaqub, on Abul Ma'ali's advice, rejected it and marched against them. Yaqub defeated the advance-guard led by Muhammad Mir but both the sides had to stop their advancements as heavy rain interfered. After the battle went indecisive, Yaqub retired to Vular Pargana to reorganise his exhausted army. But due to his ill-fate, found treachery and disloyalty in the men as they joined the Mughal forces in great number. Yaqub showed no resistance to the advancing forces of Muhammad Bhat and Muhammad Mir and left for Kishtwar while Abul Ma'ali, who put up a little fight was defeated, imprisoned and taken to Cherar, Budgam.

Shams Chak, seeing the declining conditions of the Kashmiri resistance, was convinced that defeating and preventing the Mughals was practically impossible now as the Mughals have conquered almost all of the Kashmir. He surrendered to the Mughal forces after the mediation of Sayyid Baha'ud-Din. This, even though he had his morale and spirit high, immensely saddened and disheartened Yaqub deep down inside and so decided to give up the struggle for independence and surrender to the Mughals. Akbar arrived in Kashmir in early June 1589, Yaqub also returned from Kishtwar, and on 8 August 1589, surrendered to the Mughals by paying personal homage to Emperor Akbar. This led to the unfortunate end of the reign of the last independent Sultan of Kashmir, Yaqub Shah Chak and also marked the end of Kashmiri struggle against the Mughal annexation.

Later life and death 
After paying personal homage to the Emperor and the new Sultan of his Sultanate, Yaqub was sent with Hasan Mirza Beg to Raja Man Singh, the Mughal governor of Bengal, Bihar, Odisha and Jharkand and the son of Bhagwant Das, at Rohtas, Bihar. During the journey, Yaqub, with his brother Ibrahim Chak and his followers hatched a plot to assassinate Hasan Beg and escape but the plan went unsuccessful as the Mughal guard got alert and killed Ibrahim who was approaching to kill Hasan Beg. Hasan Beg pardoned Yaqub after he repented for his role in the assassination attempt. Yaqub was safely transferred to the residence of his father in Jaunpur, and after taking a letter of guarantee from Yousuf, Hasan Beg sent Yaqub to Raja Man Singh in Rohtas where Yaqub was kept practically as a prisoner so he doesn't attempt to escape again. After Yousuf's death in 1592, Man Singh transferred Yousuf's rank to Yaqub and allowed him to settle down in the jagir of Yousuf.

Before leaving Rohtas, Yaqub met Qasim Khan who presented him with a poisoned betel leaf (paan). Yaqub, not knowing that the betel leaf was poisoned, ate it. By the time he reached Behira, his conditions grew worse and died in the month of Muharram 1001 AH/ October 1593.

Legacy 
Yaqub is believed to be a passionate ruler who cared for his Kingdom's prosperity and development. Uniting under a single banner of Kashmiris and even inviting his own bitter rival to join forces and defend the motherland Kashmir against the Mughal Invaders, showed Yaqub's affection for Kashmir and Kashmiriyat. Yaqub is also regarded as a symbol of independence among Kashmiris as he led a rebellion against Akbar and his occupying forces and never let the misconduction of his disloyal and unfaithful commanders and soldiers affect his morale.

References

Bibliography
 
 
 Haider Malik, Tarikh i Kashmir, http://worldcat.org/oclc/231642495
 Niazumuddin Ahmad, Tabaqat-i-Akbari, http://worldcat.org/oclc/935461267
 Abu-'l-Faḍl Ibn-Mubārak, Ain-i-Akbari, https://books.google.com/books?id=CsYIAAAAQAAJ
 Abu-'l-Faḍl Ibn-Mubārak, Akbar Nama, http://worldcat.org/oclc/1075953965
 Baharistan-i-Shahi, http://worldcat.org/oclc/1343198078

Further reading
 
 
 The Express Tribune. Kashmir – a land marred by betrayal (2019)bune.com.pk/article/87106/kashmir-a-land-marred-by-betrayals
 Dawn. Non-Fiction: Listening to Kashmir's walls (2022)ps://www.dawn.com/news/1672202/non-fiction-listening-to-kashmirs-walls
 Greater Kashmir. The Last King? (2022)https://www.greaterkashmir.com/todays-paper/op-ed/the-last-king
 Indian Express. Explained: A short history of Kashmir before the Mughals (2019)https://indianexpress.com/article/explained/explained-a-short-history-of-kashmir-before-the-mughals-5886523/
 History Workshop. Kashmiriyat: The death of an idea (2019)https://www.historyworkshop.org.uk/kashmiriyat-the-death-of-an-idea/

External links
 
 

Sultans of Kashmir
16th-century Indian people
Year of birth missing
1593 deaths
Deaths by poisoning